The 2009-10 National League 1, previously known as National Division 2, is the first season of the third division of the English rugby union competitions since the professionalised format of the second division was introduced with widespread league changes made by the RFU.  As the new second division would reduce teams from 16 to 12, there were plenty of new additions to National League 1, itself increasing from 14 to 16 teams, with Esher, Newbury, Manchester, Manchester and Sedgley Park all dropping down from the old National 1 while Nuneaton and London Scottish came up from the 2008–09 National Division Three North and 2008–09 National Division Three South respectively (these divisions themselves now renamed National League 2 North/South).  

At the end of the season Esher finished as champions, way ahead of runners up and newly promoted London Scottish, suffering only one defeat and going straight back up to the 2010–11 RFU Championship.  At the other end of the table, Manchester had an absolutely awful season, suffering their second successive relegation, with no wins, no bonus points, only 114 points scored and over 2,500 points conceded.  The other two sides to join them would be Nuneaton who went straight back down after one season and Newbury Blues who also suffered a second relegation in a row, losing out to 13th place Otley by just 2 points.  Manchester and Nuneaton would drop to the 2010–11 National League 2 North while Newbury would go down into the 2010–11 National League 2 South.

Participating teams and locations

League table
Notes:

Results

Round 1

Round 2

Round 3

Round 4

Round 5

Round 6

Round 7

Round 8

Round 9

Round 10

Round 11

Round 12

Round 13

Round 14

Round 15 

Postponed.  Game rescheduled for 6 February 2010.

Postponed.  Game rescheduled for 6 February 2010.

Postponed.  Game rescheduled for 6 February 2010.

Postponed.  Game rescheduled for 6 February 2010.

Postponed.  Game rescheduled for 6 February 2010.

Postponed.  Game rescheduled for 6 February 2010.

Round 16 

Postponed.  Game rescheduled for 20 March 2010.

Postponed.  Game rescheduled to 15 May 2010.

Postponed.  Game rescheduled to 20 March 2010.

Postponed.  Game rescheduled to 21 March 2010.

Postponed.  Game rescheduled to 21 March 2010.

Round 17 

Postponed.  Game rescheduled to 1 May 2010.

Postponed.  Game rescheduled to 1 May 2010.

Postponed.  Game rescheduled to 1 May 2010.

Postponed.  Game rescheduled to 1 May 2010.

Postponed.  Game rescheduled to 20 March 2010.

Postponed.  Game rescheduled to 1 May 2010.

Postponed.  Game rescheduled to 1 May 2010.

Postponed.  Game rescheduled to 1 May 2010.

Round 18 

Postponed.  Game rescheduled to 8 May 2010.

Postponed.  Game rescheduled for 14 April 2010.

Round 19

Round 20 

Postponed.  Game rescheduled for 2 February 2010.

Round 20 (Rescheduled game) 

Rescheduled from 30 January 2010.

Round 15 (Rescheduled games) 

Rescheduled from 19 December 2009.

Rescheduled from 19 December 2009.

Rescheduled from 19 December 2009.

Rescheduled from 19 December 2009.

Rescheduled from 19 December 2009.

Rescheduled from 19 December 2009.

Round 21 (Rescheduled game) 

Brought forward from 13 February 2010.

Round 21 

Brought forward to 7 February 2010.

Round 22

Round 23 

Postponed.  Game rescheduled for 8 May 2010.

Round 24

Round 25

Rounds 16 & 17 (Rescheduled games) 

Rescheduled from 9 January 2010.

Rescheduled from 2 January 2010.

Rescheduled from 2 January 2010.

Rescheduled from 2 January 2010.

Rescheduled from 2 January 2010.

Round 26

Round 27

Round 28

Round 18 (Rescheduled game)

Rescheduled from 16 January 2010.

Round 29

Round 30

Round 17 (Rescheduled games) 

Rescheduled from 9 January 2010.

Rescheduled from 9 January 2010.

Rescheduled from 9 January 2010.

Rescheduled from 9 January 2010.

Rescheduled from 9 January 2010.

Rescheduled from 9 January 2010.

Rescheduled from 9 January 2010.

Rounds 18 & 23 (Rescheduled games) 

Rescheduled from 16 January 2010.

Rescheduled from 27 February 2010.

Round 16 (Rescheduled game) 

Rescheduled from 2 January 2010.  Game cancelled as Cinderford did not have enough front row players and match would not have any outcome as Esher had already won the title and Cinderford were safe from relegation.

Total season attendances

Individual statistics 

 Note if players are tied on tries or points the player with the lowest number of appearances will come first.  Also note that points scorers includes tries as well as conversions, penalties and drop goals.

Top points scorers

Top try scorers

Season records

Team
Largest home win — 119 pts
124 - 5 Wharfedale at home to Manchester on 26 September 2009
Largest away win — 148 pts
148 - 0 Esher away to Manchester on 5 September 2009
Most points scored — 148 pts
148 - 0 Esher away to Manchester on 5 September 2009
Most tries in a match — 23
Blaydon away to Manchester on 19 September 2009
Most conversions in a match — 19
Esher away to Manchester on 5 September 2009
Most penalties in a match — 5
N/A - multiple teams
Most drop goals in a match — 2
Newbury Blues away to Blackheath on 12 September 2009

Player
Most points in a match — 51
 Sam Ulph for Esher away to Manchester on 5 September 2009
Most tries in a match — 6 (x2)
 Johannes Schmidt for Cambridge at home to Manchester on 10 April 2010
 Seb Jewell for Esher at home to Manchester on 24 April 2010
Most conversions in a match — 18
 Sam Ulph for Esher away to Manchester on 5 September 2009
Most penalties in a match —  5
N/A - multiple players
Most drop goals in a match —  2
 Mitch Burton for Newbury Blues away to Blackheath on 12 September 2009

Attendances
Highest — 2,485 
London Scottish at home to Esher on 16 January 2010
Lowest — 105 
Blaydon at home to Nuneaton on 17 April 2010
Highest Average Attendance — 1,014
London Scottish
Lowest Average Attendance — 203			
Manchester

See also
 English Rugby Union Leagues
 English rugby union system
 Rugby union in England

References

External links
 NCA Rugby

National
National League 1 seasons